is a passenger railway station located in Asahi-ku, Yokohama, Japan, operated by the private railway operator Sagami Railway (Sotetsu).

Lines 
Kibōgaoka Station is served by the Sagami Railway Main Line, and lies 12.2 kilometers from the starting point of the line at Yokohama Station.

Station layout
The station consists of two opposed side platforms serving two tracks. The station building is elevated and located above the platforms and tracks.

Platforms

Adjacent stations

History
Kibōgaoka Station opened on March 26, 1948.

Passenger statistics
In fiscal 2019, the station was used by an average of 34,404 passengers daily.

The passenger figures for previous years are as shown below.

Surrounding area
 Futamagawa River

See also
 List of railway stations in Japan

References

External links

  

Railway stations in Kanagawa Prefecture
Railway stations in Yokohama
Stations of Sagami Railway
Railway stations in Japan opened in 1948